Naftali Bennett
 Uri Ariel
 Ayelet Shaked
 Eli Ben-Dahan
 Nissan Slomiansky
 Yinon Magal
 Moti Yogev
 Bezalel Smotrich
 Shuli Mualem
 Avi Wortzman
 Nir Orbach
 Avichai Rontzki 
 Orit Strook
 Anat Roth
 Ronen Shoval
 Avihai Boaron 
 Nahi Eyal
 Moshe Solomon
 Yehudit Shilat
 Sarah Eliash
 Asher Cohen
 Shimon Meir Riklin
 Issac Amitai Cohen
 Nehemiah Rafel
 Annette Hascih
 Yosef Fox
 Zev Shwartz
 Issac Zargary
 Doron Danino
 Yigal Dalmoni
 Hannah Rina Loz
 Abraham Azoulay
 Uri Bank
 Hamotel Shapiro
 Rooney Hason
 Hagit Givor
 Amram Ben-David
 Roz Kiel
 Simon Or
 Yael Saed
 Haim Michaelis
 Moshe Goldstein
 Ortal Cohen
 Shai Blumenthal
 Jacob Solar
 Shalom Almagor
 Miriam Michal Valdigar
 Eliahu Mazoz
 Alon Ionian
 Yosef Haim Harosh
 Jeremy Sletten
 Smadar Haya Miohas
 Ori Yehuda Shahor
 Jesov Hason
 Aryeh Reuven Gor
 Amihai Lingfleder
 Lanah Leah Marost
 Tzvi Weiss
 Tuviah Bruckner
 Adi Faleh
 Zomer Sharon Teich
 David Hayon
 Yosef Magnani
 Iti Aharoni
 Aviad Bar-Hai
 Noah Nehama Afriat
 Yaara Yeshoron
 Oti Jacob
 Yeshiahu Boshen
 Dvir Hodfi
 Samuel Levi
 Natalie Akdam
 Samuel Meyerowitz
 Rotem Yanai
 Yaron Harel
 Shlomit Veleh
 Yossi Vaknin
 Yosef Franco
 Yael Ron
 Noam Sheman
 Naama Pesiah Tal
 Avi Suleiman
 Elyashiv Hacohen
 Gadi Issac Malka
 Rina Cohen
 Elisha Hovev
 Oded Yehuda Suchard
 Shalom Shtemler
 Avraham Moshe Barchad
 Sharon Ruas
 Moshe Cohen
 Rotem Itiel Kakun
 Ofir Toil
 Avihai Tabak
 Mihal Shulamit Calderon
 Itai Garnek
 Paz Samuel Glickman
 Michael Simnatov
 Guy David Marciano
 Segev Ilanit Ginsbury
 Noam Weiss
 Avinoam Goalman
 Doron Issac Beinhorn
 Yehiel Meir Wasserman
 Noah Nechama Raviv
 Bentzion Gedaliah Arviv
 Shai Natan
 Haim Drukman

External links 
Central Elections Committee Official Jewish Home List

Lists of Israeli politicians